Stanley Film Festival was a horror film festival located in Estes Park, Colorado. Founded in 2013, the festival showcased independent horror films, including features, shorts and special events with guest filmmakers. The festival was named for the Stanley Hotel in Estes Park where it is held, a neo-Georgian hotel that was the inspiration and setting of Stephen King's horror novel The Shining. The festival also held a student film competition titled, The Stanley Dean's Cup.

2013 Festival 
The inaugural festival was held May 2–5, 2013. Opening night film: The Purge with director James DeMonaco and producer Jason Blum in attendance. The 2013 festival was curated by Programming Director Landon Zakheim and programmer Michael Lerman, with films from 13 different countries.

Selected Films

Special Events 
 "Secrets of The Shining" panel discussion about Stanley Kubrick's The Shining, which complimented a screening of Room 237. 
 It included Room 237 director Rodney Ascher and subject Jay Weidner, Leon Vitali, who was Kubrick's personal assistant on The Shining,
 Mick Garris, director of The Shining (TV miniseries),  and moderated by Badass Digest writer Devin Faraci.

 Presentation of The Cabinet of Dr. Caligari with live piano score by performer Hank Troy.
 "Composing for Genre Cinema" - a panel discussion with film score composers, Nathan Barr, Jonathan Snipes, William Hutson, Hank Troy and Mark Schulz.
 Live performance by the John Chaos Sideshow.

2013 Awards

2014 Festival 
The 2nd annual festival took place April 24–27, 2014.

Selected Films

2014 Awards

2015 Festival 
The 3rd annual festival took place April 30 - May 3, 2015.

Opening night film: Cooties with SpectreVision production company partners Daniel Noah, Josh Waller, and Elijah Wood in attendance.

Selected Films

2015 Awards

External links 
 Official Site - www.stanleyfilmfest.com

References 

Film festivals in Colorado
Fantasy and horror film festivals in the United States